The 2019 KNSB Dutch Single Distance Championships were held at the Thialf ice stadium in Heerenveen from Friday 28 December 2018 to Sunday 30 December 2018. Although the tournament was held in 2018 it was the 2019 edition as it was part of the 2018–2019 speed skating season.

Schedule

Medalists

Men

Source:

Women

Source:

References

External links
 KNSB

Dutch Single Distance Championships
Single Distance Championships
2019 Single Distance
KNSB Dutch Single Distance Championships, 2019